CQE may refer to:

 Carbon quantitative easing, an unconventional monetary policy that is featured in a global carbon reward
 Certified Quality Engineer, a certification given by the American Society for Quality